The women's omnium competition at the 2014 Asian Games was held on 24 and 25 September 2014 at the Incheon International Velodrome.

Schedule
All times are Korea Standard Time (UTC+09:00)

Results

Scratch race

Individual pursuit

Elimination race

500m time trial

Flying lap

Points race

Summary

References 
Results

External links 
 

Track Women omnium